Palestine Township is a township in Story County, Iowa, USA.  As of the 2000 census, its population was 4,604.

Geography
According to the USGS, it contains six cemeteries: Lincoln Cemetery, Bethany Cemetery, Slater Cemetery, Sheldahl Lutheran Cemetery, Fjeldberg Cemetery and Palestine Cemetery

Major Highways
  U.S. Route 69 (North-South) 
  Iowa Highway 210 (East-West)

References
 USGS Geographic Names Information System (GNIS)

External links
 US-Counties.com
 City-Data.com

Townships in Story County, Iowa
Townships in Iowa